Jason Rosener (born 12 February 1975 in Omaha, Nebraska) is a retired American alpine skier who was in the 1998 Winter Olympics.

External links
 sports-reference.com
 

1975 births
Living people
American male alpine skiers
Olympic alpine skiers of the United States
Alpine skiers at the 1998 Winter Olympics
Sportspeople from Omaha, Nebraska